José Manuel Suárez Rivas (born 18 February 1974), known as Sietes, is a Spanish former professional footballer who played as a left-back.

He appeared in 194 La Liga matches over ten seasons, mainly for Racing de Santander. He started his 19-year senior career with Real Oviedo.

Club career
Sietes, who was born in Sietes, Asturias, receiving his nickname from his birthplace, started playing for local giants Real Oviedo, first appearing with the first team on 27 March 1994 in a 0–0 away draw against Real Valladolid. With just nine La Liga matches throughout the entire season, he did score two goals in back-to-back 3–0 wins, over Athletic Bilbao and Atlético Madrid.

Signing with Valencia CF in the 1995–96 campaign, Sietes was used sparingly over two seasons – underperforming mainly due to homesickness– and moved to Racing de Santander for 1997–98, where he would constantly battle top-flight relegation (which would eventually befall in 2001, with the club returning in the immediate following season with 39 appearances from the player). His career was unassuming afterwards, with stints mainly in the second division, punctuated by a season with Watford in the English Championship where he did not play one single minute.

After only five games for CD Numancia in the 2007–08 campaign, with the Soria team returning to the top division after a three-year absence, Sietes moved to fourth-tier side CD Lealtad in Villaviciosa, remaining there three seasons. On 31 August 2012, after having helped Real Avilés, also in his native region, promote to the third level, the 38-year-old announced his retirement.

International career
Sietes represented Spain at the 1996 Summer Olympics, appearing once for the quarter-finalists.

Post-retirement
After retiring, Sietes was Avilés' general manager for a brief period of time. Also, he worked as mayor of Rales (a parish in Llanes, from 2007 to 2011), councilman in the Villaviciosa town hall (2011–12) and scout of RCD Mallorca.

Additionally, Sietes was involved in rural tourism.

Honours
Numancia
Segunda División: 2007–08

Spain U21
UEFA European Under-21 Championship: runner-up 1996

References

External links

1974 births
Living people
People from Villaviciosa, Asturias
Spanish footballers
Footballers from Asturias
Association football defenders
La Liga players
Segunda División players
Tercera División players
Real Oviedo Vetusta players
Real Oviedo players
Valencia CF players
Racing de Santander players
Deportivo Alavés players
Real Murcia players
CD Numancia players
CD Lealtad players
Real Avilés CF footballers
Watford F.C. players
Spain under-21 international footballers
Spain under-23 international footballers
Olympic footballers of Spain
Footballers at the 1996 Summer Olympics
Spanish expatriate footballers
Expatriate footballers in England
Spanish expatriate sportspeople in England